The 23rd Artistic Gymnastics World Championships were held in Montreal, Quebec, Canada, 3 to 10 November 1985.

Results

Men

Team Final

All-around

Floor Exercise

Pommel Horse

Rings

Vault

Parallel Bars

Horizontal Bar

Women

Team Final

All-around

Neither Shushunova nor Omelianchik had originally qualified to the individual all-around final. However, the Soviet coaches felt they would have a good shot at medalling, so their teammates Olga Mostepanova and Irina Baraksanova were pulled from all individual finals under the guise of injury.

Vault

Uneven bars

Balance beam

Floor exercise

Medals

References

External links
Gymn Forum: World Championships Results
Gymnastics

World Artistic Gymnastics Championships
G
World Artistic Gymnastics Championships
World Artistic Gymnastics Championships
1985 in Quebec